Beni Oktovianto (born 23 October 1998) is an Indonesian professional footballer who plays as a forward and winger for Liga 1 club Persik Kediri.

Club career

Persik Kediri
He was signed for Persik Kediri to play in Liga 2 in the 2017 season.

Persiba Balikpapan
On 12 March 2018, Beni signed a one-year contract with Liga 2 club Persiba Balikpapan. He made 22 league appearances and scored 9 goals for Persiba in the 2018 Liga 2 (Indonesia)

Kalteng Putra
In 2018, Beni signed a contract with Liga 2 club Kalteng Putra on a free transfer.

Return to Persiba Balikpapan
On 11 March 2019, it was confirmed that Beni would re-join Persiba Balikpapan, signing a year contract. He made 18 league appearances and scored 2 goals for Persiba Balikpapan in the 2019 Liga 1 (Indonesia).

Persib Bandung
He was signed for Persib Bandung to play in Liga 1 in the 2020 season. This season was suspended on 27 March 2020 due to the COVID-19 pandemic. The season was abandoned and was declared void on 20 January 2021.

Barito Putera
He was signed for Barito Putera to play in Liga 1 in the 2021 season. Beni made his debut on 4 September 2021 in a match against Persib Bandung. On 15 October 2021, Beni scored his first goal for Barito Putera against PSS Sleman in the 18th minute at the Manahan Stadium, Surakarta.

PSMS Medan
Beni was signed for PSMS Medan to play in Liga 2 in the 2022–23 season. He made his league debut on 30 August 2022 in a match against PSKC Cimahi at the Si Jalak Harupat Stadium, Soreang.

Career statistics

Club

References

External links
 Beni Oktovianto at Soccerway

1998 births
Living people
Indonesian footballers
Persib Bandung players
Association football forwards
People from Pontianak
Sportspeople from West Kalimantan